The inferior genicular arteries (inferior articular arteries), two in number, arise from the popliteal beneath the gastrocnemius. On the inside of the knee, is the medial inferior genicular artery, and on the outer side is the lateral inferior genicular artery.

See also
 Patellar anastomosis

References

Arteries of the lower limb